Kings Bromley is a civil parish in the district of Lichfield, Staffordshire, England.  It contains 24 listed buildings that are recorded in the National Heritage List for England.  Of these, one is at Grade I, the highest of the three grades, and the others are at Grade II, the lowest grade.  The parish contains the village of Kings Bromley and the surrounding countryside.  Most of the listed buildings are houses, cottages, farmhouses and farm buildings, many of which are timber framed or have timber framed cores, and some of the houses and cottages have thatched roofs.  The Trent and Mersey Canal passes through the parish, and the listed buildings associated with it are two bridges, a lock, a lock keeper's cottage, and a milepost.  The other listed buildings are a church, a churchyard cross, structures associated with a former manor house, and a war memorial.


Key

Buildings

References

Citations

Sources

Lists of listed buildings in Staffordshire